Sugauli is a city and a notified area in East Champaran district in the Indian state of Bihar. It is the setting for Rudyard Kipling's story "Rikki-Tikki-Tavi" (spelled as "Segowlee" in said story), and the place where a treaty was signed with Nepal in 1816.

Demographics
 India census, Sugauli town had a population of 38,815. Sugauli is a Nagar Panchayat city in district of Purbi Champaran, Bihar. The Sugauli city is divided into 20 wards for which elections are held every 5 years. The Sugauli Nagar Panchayat has population of 38,815 of which 20,584 are males while 18,231 are females as per report released by Census India 2011. Population of Children with age of 0-6 is 7810 which is 20.12% of total population of Sugauli (NP). In Sugauli Nagar Panchayat, Female Sex Ratio is of 886 against state average of 918. Moreover, Child Sex Ratio in Sugauli is around 937 compared to Bihar state average of 935. Literacy rate of Sugauli city is 64.90% higher than state average of 61.80%. In Sugauli, Male literacy is around 73.45% while female literacy rate is 55.10%. Sugauli Nagar Panchayat has total administration over 7,480 houses to which it supplies basic amenities like water and sewerage. It is also authorized to build roads within Nagar Panchayat limits and impose taxes on properties coming under its jurisdiction.

History 
Sugauli has great role in India's independence war. Sugauli is the part of SATYAGRAHA movement what GANDHI JI has started from the Champaran, and that movement inspired a lot of youth at that time to contribute for the nation and few of them were Janardan Pandey and Babulal Mishra from Sugauli, Late Pt. Tuni jha, Laxmi Narayan Jha, Upendra Jha, Ramesh Chandra Jha, Sukham Mishra from Phulwaria, Yamuna kant Jha from Sugaon. Sugauli is also known for Sugauli Treaty, which was signed between British India and Nepal in March 1816.

Panchayats 
There are 16 Gram Panchayats in sugauli block.

 Phulwaria
 North Sugaon
 South Sugaon
 North Sripur
 South Sripur
 Bhataha
 Bhargawan
 North Chhapra Bahas
 South Chhapra Bahas
 Sukul Pakar
 North Mansingha
 South Mansingha
 Mali
 Pajiarwa
 Baghi
 Karmawa Raghunathpur

Villages
There are many villages around 100 in Sugauli block. Some of important villages are as follows:

Chhapwa: It connects Motihari with Bettiah via NH 28, Sugaon : Earlier it was a capital of Tirhut region (as per Gazetteer),Bhathan, Phulwaria, Panjiyarwa, Karmwa and many small villages.

List of Villages in Sugauli
1. Baghi
2. Bahuari
3. Baksa
4. Baluwa Tikulia
5. Baudha
6. Bhargawan
7. Bhataha
8. Bhawanipur
9. Biguia
10. Chainpur
11. Chhagraha
12. Chhapra Bahas
13. Chiljhapti Urf Juajat
14. Dewdatwa
15. Dumdumwa
16. Gorgawan
17. Gurhaurf Koraia
18. Hathiahiya
19. Kaithwalia
20. Khonra
21. Khutiharwa
22. Lal Parsa
23. Ledihar
24. Madhopur Bahuarwa Urf Danditol
25. Madhopurkaramwa
26. Madhopurnankar
27. Madhopurnizamat
28. Mali
29. Mansingha
30. Muda Chhapra
31. Muswa
32. Pachbhirwa
33. Pajiarwa
34. Parsauna
35. Parsurampur
36. Phulwaria
37. Phulwaria Ojha
38. Raghunathpur
39. Roypatti
40. Sapaha
41. Shampur
42. Siripur
43. Sirkhandi
44. Suganw
45. Sukul Pakar Urf Belwalia
46. Tola Dharampur
47. Unwa Birit

Transport
Railway

Sugauli is connected to different cities of India through railways. Sagauli Junction railway station is the main railway station serving the city. Direct trains are available to all the major destinations across India like Patna, Delhi, Mumbai, Kolkata, Guwahati, Ahemdabad, Lucknow, Jaipur, Jammu & Katra, etc.

Roadway

National Highway 727 , 139W , 28B , AH42 and State Highway 54 passes through the city.

The National Highway Authority of India (NHAI) has notified a new Patna-Bettiah road as National Highway 139W, setting the state for construction of a high-quality four-lane road between the two towns that would reduce the distance between them to 167 kilometres from the current 200-odd km and travel time to around two hours.

Tola San Saraiyan new town aided village. The new Gopalganj-Bettiah Road passed through this new town aided village. Through this new road a distance of 60 km (37 mi) become shorten for Gopalganj-Bettiah.

Airway 
The nearest airport is Kushinagar International Airport which is about 117 km (71 mi) from Sugauli. The nearest airport in bihar is Jay Prakash Narayan International Airport located in Patna which is about 200 km (120 mi) via Muzaffarpur and 177 km (110 mi) via areraj.

Also
 Sugauli Treaty
 Ramesh Chandra Jha
 Anuranjan Jha

References

Cities and towns in East Champaran district